The Moncloa Pacts were economic and political agreements to address inflation and unemployment during the Spanish transition to democracy in the late 1970s. These were attended by major labour unions such as the UGT and the CNT.

Economic problems  
There was a lot of economic issues which confluenced into a large crisis that the Government of Spain had to deal with after its inauguration. The petrol crisis of 1973 took some time to reach Spain, the rise of unemployment which was caused by emigration. The death of Franco saw a slow return. There was also capital flight since the last years of Franco's dictatorship. Businesses were used to the corporatism and interventionism of Franco's regime. The economic policy of the transition period as well as the legalization of syndicates which vindicated the working class and sometimes took on a confrontational and militant stance. This confronted businesses with a new situation.

Previous conversations
Before the pacts Adolfo Suárez had engaged with Felipe González and Santiago Carrillo. Their goal was to establish a more stable government since they lacked a majority in the parliament. In addition to that the general courts had yet to be constituent, this was a particular point that of the opposition and a portion of Suarez's own government, the Union of the Democratic Centre.

Enrique Fuentes Quintana at Suárez's behest engaged in talks with the newly legalized syndicates and unions such as General Union of Workers and Workers' Commissions (CC.OO). This was done to solve the social conflict. The General Union of Workers (UGT) and the CNT originally rejected the proposals. However the UGT and the CC.OO ended up ratifying the pact. The CNT was the only one who wholly rejected it.

See also 

 Wassenaar Agreement, a 1982 Dutch agreement credited with ending the 1970s wage-price spiral

References

Bibliography 

 

1977 in Spain
Spanish transition to democracy
Legal history of Spain
Labor in Spain
1977 in labor relations